Braythorn is a village in the Harrogate district of North Yorkshire, England.

Villages in North Yorkshire